Phillip Wayne Stidham (born November 18, 1968) is former Major League Baseball pitcher.

Stidham attended Nathan Hale High School in Tulsa and then played four years of college baseball at Arkansas exclusively as a relief pitcher.

References

External links

1968 births
Living people
Arkansas Razorbacks baseball players
Baseball players from Oklahoma
Detroit Tigers players
Lakeland Tigers players
Fayetteville Generals players
London Tigers players
Toledo Mud Hens players
Trenton Thunder players
Chattanooga Lookouts players
Norfolk Tides players
Binghamton Mets players
Salt Lake Buzz players
New Haven Ravens players
Hardware City Rock Cats players
Colorado Springs Sky Sox players
Major League Baseball pitchers
Sportspeople from Tulsa, Oklahoma
American expatriate baseball players in Canada
All-American college baseball players